Scribble Mural Comic Journal is the debut studio album by American indie rock band A Sunny Day in Glasgow. It was released on February 13, 2007 by Notenuf Records. Ruined Potential Records reissued the album on LP on August 5, 2008.

Recording
Scribble Mural Comic Journal was recorded from January to August 2006 by A Sunny Day in Glasgow, at the time consisting of siblings Ben, Lauren and Robin Daniels. It was recorded at Ben Daniels' apartment in West Philadelphia and the Daniels siblings' parents' houses in Abington. The album also incorporates sounds recorded in the streets of London in 2005.

The Scribble Mural Comic Journal tracks "The Best Summer Ever", "C'mon" and "A Mundane Phone Call to Jack Parsons" were first released as the opening three tracks on A Sunny Day in Glasgow's 2006 debut EP The Sunniest Day Ever.

Several outtakes from Scribble Mural Comic Journal were later released on the band's 2007 EP Tout New Age.

Critical reception

In 2018, Pitchfork ranked Scribble Mural Comic Journal at number 30 on its list of the best dream pop albums.

Track listing

Personnel
Credits are adapted from the album's liner notes.

A Sunny Day in Glasgow
 Ben Daniels
 Lauren Daniels
 Robin Daniels

Additional musicians
 Jody Hamilton – horns
 Steve Heise – banjo
 The Merds – additional vocals on "No. 6 Von Karman Street"

Production
 A Sunny Day in Glasgow – production, mixing, recording
 Dan Swift – mastering

Design
 Naomi Donabedian – design
 Ever Nalens – artwork

References

External links
 

2007 debut albums
A Sunny Day in Glasgow albums
Albums recorded in a home studio